Archbishop Gomez may refer to:

 Drexel Gomez (born 1937), former Archbishop of the West Indies
 José Horacio Gómez (born 1951), Archbishop of Los Angeles
 Rubén Salazar Gómez (born 1942), Cardinal Archbishop of Bogotá